Erik Batte Herrera (born 10 December 1974 in Sagua la Grande, Villa Clara) is a retired Cuban hurdler.

He finished seventh at the 1995 World Championships, eighth at the 1996 Summer Olympics and third at the 1998 Central American and Caribbean Games.

His personal best time was 13.26 seconds, achieved in the semi final at the 1996 Summer Olympics in Atlanta. The result places him sixth (joint with Yuniel Hernández) among Cuban 110 m hurdlers, behind Anier García, Dayron Robles, Emilio Valle, Alejandro Casañas and Yoel Hernández.

Competition record

References
sports-reference

1974 births
Living people
People from Sagua la Grande
Cuban male hurdlers
Athletes (track and field) at the 1995 Pan American Games
Athletes (track and field) at the 1996 Summer Olympics
Olympic athletes of Cuba
Central American and Caribbean Games bronze medalists for Cuba
Competitors at the 1998 Central American and Caribbean Games
Central American and Caribbean Games medalists in athletics
Pan American Games competitors for Cuba
20th-century Cuban people
21st-century Cuban people